Harborside or Harbourside may refer to:

 Harborside, Maine
 Harborside (Jersey City), buildings in New Jersey, United States
 Harborside (HBLR station)
 Harborside station (San Diego Trolley)
 Harbourside monorail station, Sydney, Australia
 Harborside Health Center, a cannabis dispensary with multiple locations in the San Francisco Bay Area
 The Harbourside, building in Hong Kong
 Harbourside Park, Poole, England